The 2016–17 Greek Volleyleague is the 49th season of the Greek Volleyleague, the highest tier professional volley league in Greece. The defending champion is PAOK.

Teams

12 teams participate in the 2016–17 Volleyleague.
The 10 highest ranked teams from the 2015–16 Volleyleague final standings: PAOK, Foinikas Syros, Olympiacos, Kifissia, Panathinaikos, Pamvohaikos, Ethnikos Alexandroupolis, Panacahiki, Orestiada, Iraklis Thessaloniki.
The 2 promoted teams from the A2 Ethniki 2015–16: Iraklis Chalkidas and Kyzikos.

Regular season
The Regular season of the 2016–17 Volleyleague Greece is held in a round robin format. At season finish, teams occupying positions 1–8 advance to 2016–17 Volleyleague Play-offs, while teams occupying positions 9–12 advance to 2016–17 Volleyleague Greece Play-outs.

League table

 

|}

Source: Volleyleague.gr

Results

Play-out (9–11)
 1st/4th fixture Panachaiki vs Iraklis Chalkidas 2-3/0-3
 2nd/5th fixture Iraklis Chalkidas vs Kyzikos Nea Peramos 3-2/0-3
 3rd/6th fixture Kyzikos Nea Peramos vs Panachaiki 2-3/1-3
 Score table: Iraklis Chalkidas 7, Panachaiki 6, Kyzikos Nea Peramos 5.

Source: Volleyleague.gr Play-out 9–12

Play-off (1–8)
The eight teams that finished in the places 1 to 8 in the Regular season, compete in the Play-off (1–8).

Final standings

References

External links
Greek Volleyleague, Official Page
Greek Volleyball Federation

Greece
2016 in volleyball
2017 in men's volleyball
Volleyball competitions in Greece
2016 in Greek sport
2017 in Greek sport